The 1983 Pan American Men's Handball Championship was the third edition of the tournament, held in Colorado Springs, United States from 13 to 21 January 1984. It acted as the American qualifying tournament for the 1984 Summer Olympics, where the top placed team qualied.

Standings

Results

External links
Results on todor66.com

Pan American Men's Handball Championship
Pan American Men's Championship
Pan American Men's Handball Championship
International handball competitions hosted by the United States
Pan American Men's Handball Championship